Ævar Ingi Jóhannesson (born 31 January 1995) is an Icelandic footballer who currently plays for Stjarnan.

Career statistics

References

External links
 

Living people
1995 births
Aevar Ingi Johannesson
Aevar Ingi Johannesson
Aevar Ingi Johannesson
Aevar Ingi Johannesson
Association football midfielders
Stjarnan players